This article is a list of films produced in South Korea in 1966:

References

External links
1966 in South Korea

 1960-1969 at koreanfilm.org

South Korea
1966
Films